Waddy is a surname. Notable people with the surname include:

Billy Waddy (1954-2022), former professional American football player
Charis Waddy (1909–2004), Australian-born British author, lecturer and Islamic scholar
Gar Waddy (Edgar Lloyd Waddy, 1879–1963), Australian cricketer
John Waddy (disambiguation)
John Lloyd Waddy (1916–1987), senior officer and aviator in the Royal Australian Air Force (RAAF)
Jude Waddy (born 1975), former professional American football player
Mick Waddy (Ernest Frederick Waddy, 1880–1958), Australian cricketer and clergyman
Nan Waddy (1915–2015), Australian psychiatrist
Ray Waddy (born 1956), former American football player
Samuel Danks Waddy (1830–1902), English politician
Percival Stacy Waddy 1875–1937), Australian cricketer and clergyman